Michelle Laone Page (born January 19, 1987) is an American actress and associate producer.

Early years
Page was born in Fort Worth, Texas, the daughter of Tom and Sharon Page.

Acting career
Page began her career at a young age in professional theatre. Upon moving to Los Angeles at age 15, she first appeared with  Sandra Bullock in Miss Congeniality 2: Armed & Fabulous. Since, Page has appeared in such films as Rogue River with Bill Moseley, Together Again For the First Time, Sublime, and Sensored opposite Robert Picardo. She also starred with Kathy Baker in the indie comedy/drama The Party Is Over. Furthermore, Page was cast as Young Myrtle Snow in Season 3 of FX's American Horror Story with a strong female cast, including Frances Conroy, who played Myrtle Snow. Page has numerous guest star credits in television, including Amazon Studios's Bosch, The Mentalist, CSI: NY, Bones, Castle, Girl Meets World, Ghost Whisperer, Saving Grace and Cold Case. She has also appeared in several national commercials, including AT&T, Leapfrog Educational Computers, Radio Shack (with Vanessa L. Williams and Ving Rhames), Clean & Clear, Secure Horizons, Taco Bell (with famed boxer Evander Holyfield), and an anti-meth campaign for the White House Office of National Drug Control Policy. Page studied at the Royal Academy of Dramatic Art in London.

Personal life

Page graduated summa cum laude from Columbia University with a bachelor's degree in psychology and subsequently obtained her MSW from Columbia University School of Social Work in New York City. She became engaged to architectural designer Phillip Crupi in March 2017, and the couple wed in December 2017.

Filmography

References

External links

Vimeo - TV/Film Clips
http://www.watertownology.com
 https://web.archive.org/web/20140222141040/http://www.watertownthefilm.com/
Boomtron Interview 09/12/2011
Parx-e Interview 03/15/2007
Parx-e Interview 09/05/2006

American film actresses
Actresses from Texas
1987 births
Living people
American stage actresses
American television actresses
People from Fort Worth, Texas
Columbia University School of General Studies alumni
Columbia University School of Social Work alumni
American people of English descent
American people of Scotch-Irish descent
21st-century American women